This article summarizes the outcomes of all official matches played by the Netherlands national football team by opponent and by decade, since they first played in official competitions in 1904.

Record per opponent
The following table shows Netherlands's all-time international record per opponent. It excludes any unofficial matches.

 Draws include Penalty shoot-outs

Results in chronological order

1900s and 1910s

45 matches played:

1920s and 1930s

112 matches played:

1940s and 1950s

1960s and 1970s

1980s and 1990s

2000s

2010s

2020s

References

Netherlands national results in chronological order, and head-to-head record against all countries – RSSSF